Pliosauroidea is an extinct clade of plesiosaurs, known from the earliest Jurassic to early Late Cretaceous. They are best known for the subclade Thalassophonea, which contained crocodile-like short-necked forms with large heads and massive toothed jaws, commonly known as pliosaurs. More primitive non-thalassophonean pliosauroids resembled pleisiosaurs in possessing relatively long necks and smaller heads. They originally included only members of the family Pliosauridae, of the order Plesiosauria, but several other genera and families are now also included, the number and details of which vary according to the classification used.

The distinguishing characteristics are a short neck and an elongated head, with larger hind flippers compared to the fore flippers, the opposite of the plesiosaurs. They were carnivorous and their long and powerful jaws carried many sharp, conical teeth. Pliosaurs range from 4 to 15 metres and more in length. Their prey may have included fish, sharks, ichthyosaurs, dinosaurs and other plesiosaurs.

The largest known species are Kronosaurus and Pliosaurus macromerus; other well known genera include Rhomaleosaurus, Peloneustes, and Macroplata. Fossil specimens have been found in Africa, Australia, China, Europe, North America and South America.

Many very early (from the Early Jurassic and possibly Latest Triassic, i.e. Rhaetian) primitive pliosauroids were very like plesiosauroids in appearance and, indeed, used to be included in the family Plesiosauridae.

Name

Pliosauroidea was named by Welles in 1943. It is adapted from the name of the genus Pliosaurus, which is derived from the Greek , meaning "more/closely", and  meaning "lizard"; it therefore means "more saurian". The name Pliosaurus was coined in 1841 by Richard Owen, who believed that it represented a link between plesiosauroids and crocodilians (considered a type of "saurian"), particularly due to their crocodile-like teeth.

Classification

Taxonomy

The taxonomy presented here is mainly based on the plesiosaur cladistic analysis proposed by Hilary F. Ketchum and Roger B. J. Benson, 2011 unless otherwise noted.

Suborder Pliosauroidea
? Eurysaurus
? Sinopliosaurus
Family Rhomaleosauridae
 Archaeonectrus
 Borealonectes
? Bishanopliosaurus
 Eurycleidus
 Macroplata
 Maresaurus
 Rhomaleosaurus
 Meyerasaurus
 Sthenarosaurus
? Yuzhoupliosaurus
Family Pliosauridae
 Anguanax
 Attenborosaurus
 Gallardosaurus
 Hauffiosaurus
 Marmornectes
 Megalneusaurus
 Liopleurodon 
 Eardasaurus
 Pachycostasaurus
 Peloneustes
 Pliosaurus 
 Rhaeticosaurus
 Simolestes
 Thalassiodracon
Subfamily Brachaucheninae
 Brachauchenius
 Kronosaurus
 Makhaira
 Megacephalosaurus
 Polyptychodon
 Sachicasaurus 
 Monquirasaurus
 Stenorhynchosaurus
 Luskhan

Phylogeny

Pliosauroidea is a stem-based taxon that was defined by Welles as "all taxa more closely related to Pliosaurus brachydeirus than to Plesiosaurus dolichodeirus". Pliosauridae and Rhomaleosauridae are stem-based taxa too. Pliosauridae is defined as "all taxa more closely related to Pliosaurus brachydeirus than to Leptocleidus superstes, Polycotylus latipinnis or Meyerasaurus victor". Rhomaleosauridae is defined as "all taxa more closely related to Meyerasaurus victor than to Leptocleidus superstes, Pliosaurus brachydeirus or Polycotylus latipinnis". The cladogram below follows a 2011 analysis by paleontologists Hilary F. Ketchum and Roger B. J. Benson, and reduced to genera only.

Large pliosauroids
In 2002, the discovery of a very large pliosauroid was announced in Mexico. This pliosauroid came to be known as the "Monster of Aramberri". Although widely reported as such, it does not belong to the genus Liopleurodon. The remains of this animal, consisting of a partial vertebral column, were dated to the Kimmeridgian of the La Caja Formation. The fossils were found much earlier, in 1985, by a geology student and were at first erroneously attributed to a theropod dinosaur by Hahnel. The remains originally contained part of a rostrum with teeth (now lost).

In August 2006, palaeontologists of the University of Oslo discovered the first remains of a pliosaur on Norwegian soil. The remains were described as "very well preserved, as well as being unique in their completeness". The large animal was determined to be a new species of Pliosaurus. In the summer of 2008, the fossil remains of the huge pliosaur were dug up from the permafrost on Svalbard, a Norwegian island close to the North Pole. The excavation of the find is documented in the 2009 History television special Predator X.

On 26 October 2009, palaeontologists reported the discovery of potentially the largest pliosauroid yet found. Palaeontologist Richard Forrest told the BBC: "I had heard rumours that something big was turning up. But seeing this thing in the flesh, so to speak, is just jaw dropping. It is simply enormous." It was determined that the specimen belonged to a new species that scientists named Pliosaurus kevani.

References

External links

 The Plesiosaur Directory - pliosaur page
 Large pliosaur from the Jurassic Coast, Dorset - BBC News
 Dorset pliosaur skull after conservation - video. BBC July 2011
 Fossils News - ScienceDaily: Luskhan Itilensis 2017

Plesiosaurs
Hettangian first appearances
Cenomanian extinctions